Robert J. Le Roy (September 30, 1943 – August 10, 2018) was a Canadian chemist.  He held the distinguished title of University Professor at the University of Waterloo.

Career
His work on the Morse/Long-range potential with his former student Nike Dattani of Oxford University was referred to as a "landmark in diatomic spectral analysis". In the landmark work, the C3 value for atomic lithium was determined to a higher-precision than any atom's previously measured  oscillator strength, by an order of magnitude.  This lithium oscillator strength is related to the radiative lifetime of atomic lithium and is used as a benchmark for atomic clocks and measurements of fundamental constants.

Awards and Honors
 1994 Rutherford Memorial Medal in Chemistry from the Royal Society of Canada
 1995 J. Heyrovsky Honorary Medal for Merit in the Chemical Sciences from the Academy of Sciences of the Czech Republic.

See also
 List of University of Waterloo people

References

External links
 Robert J. LeRoy's homepage at University of Waterloo

1943 births
2018 deaths
People from Ottawa
University of Toronto alumni
University of Wisconsin–Madison alumni
Canadian chemists
Computational chemists